Simisani Mathumo (born 11 November 1991) is a Motswana footballer who plays for Botola side Olympique Khouribga and the Botswana national football team.

Simisani began his football career in the Township Rollers academy in 2005. He was given his first senior appearance by then manager Madinda Ndlovu as a sixteen year old. After impressing Simisani would go on to become a mainstay in the Rollers defence, playing for them over twelve years and winning all of the cups on offer including six Premier Leagues, one FA Cup and two Mascom Top 8 Cups. He left Rollers in 2019 to join South African side Free State Stars but his contract was terminated after the club was relegated from the Absa Premiership and he returned to Rollers.

Style of play
Throughout his career he has featured predominantly as a classic sweeper defender, mainly due to his mobility and ability to tackle. Due to his size and height he is also dependable for ball clearance and is a constant goal threat especially in setpieces.

Honours

Clubs
 Township Rollers
Botswana Premier League:6
2009-10, 2010-11, 2013-14, 2015-16, 2016-17, 2017-18
FA Cup:1
2009-10
Mascom Top 8 Cup:2
2011-12, 2017-18

Individual honours
FUB Player of the Season: 2017
FUB Team of the Year: 2016, 2017

References

External links

1991 births
Living people
Botswana footballers
Botswana international footballers
Association football defenders
Botswana expatriate footballers
Expatriate soccer players in South Africa
Botswana expatriate sportspeople in South Africa
Expatriate footballers in Morocco
Botswana expatriate sportspeople in Morocco
Botola players
Township Rollers F.C. players
Free State Stars F.C. players
Olympique Club de Khouribga players